Kircho Krumov (born 29 June 1983) is a Bulgarian footballer who currently plays for Haskovo as a defender.

References

External links
Profile at football24.bg

1983 births
Living people
Bulgarian footballers
First Professional Football League (Bulgaria) players
FC Haskovo players
FC Lyubimets players
FC Sportist Svoge players
OFC Sliven 2000 players
Association football defenders
People from Haskovo
Sportspeople from Haskovo Province